På egna ben is Carola Häggkvist's third long-play album, released in late 1984. The biggest hit from the album is the title track, which in fact is a Swedish cover version of an old Bryan Adams song. In Finland, the bonus track "Albatross" also was included. On the album charts, the albums peaked at number 5 in Sweden and number 10 in Norway.

Swedish track listing
 "På egna ben" (Swedish lyrics of "Can't Wait All Night")
 "I en sommarnatt"
 "Terpsichore"
 "Kärlekens natt"
 "Här är mitt liv"
 "Hand i hand"
 "Om du törs"
 "Amore"
 "Så attraherad"
 "Gjord av sten"
 "Ge av dig själv"
 "Du lever inom mig"

European track listing
 You're Still On My Mind
 One By One
 Life
 Love Isn't Love
 Let There Be Love
 Radio Love
 I Think I Like It
 Tommy Loves Me
 Albatros
 Thunder and Lightning
 Tokyo
 Hunger
 It's Raining in Stockholm

Canadian track listing
 Tommy Loves Me
 I Think I Like It
 Thunder And Lightning
 Tokyo
 Hunger
 It's Raining in Stockholm
 You're Still On My Mind
 One By One
 Life
 Love Isn't Love
 Let There Be Love
 Radio Love

Release history

Chart positions

References

1984 albums
Carola Häggkvist albums